A caricaturist is an artist who specializes in drawing caricatures.

List of caricaturists

 Abed Abdi (born 1942)
 Al Hirschfeld (1903–2003)
 Alex Gard (1900–1948)
 Alexander Saroukhan (1898–1977)
 Alfred Grévin (1827–1892)
 Alfred Schmidt (1858–1938)
 Amédée de Noé, also known as Cham (1818–1879)
 Amnon David Ar (born 1973)
 Andre Gill (1840–1885)
 Angelo Torres (born 1932)
 Arifur Rahman (born 1984)
 Arthur Good (1853–1928)
 Aurelius Battaglia (1910–1984)
 Lluís Bagaria (1882–1940)
 Bill Plympton (born 1946)
 Bob Staake (born 1957)
 Boris Yefimov (1899–2008)
 Bruce Stark (1933–2012)
 Cabu (1938–2015)
 Carlo Pellegrini (1839–1889)
 Cem Kiziltug (born 1974)
 Charles Williams (1798–1830)
 Dan Dunn (born 1957)
 Daniel Stieglitz (born 1980)
 David Levine (1926–2009)
 Sir David  Low (1891–1963)
 Don Barclay (1892–1975)
 Donald Bevan (1920–2013)
 Drew Friedman
 Dušan Petričić (born 1946)
 Edmund S. Valtman (1914–2005)
 Emad Hajjaj (born 1967)
 Émile Cohl (1857–1938)
 Emilio Coia (1911–1997)
 GAL (born 1940)
 Gaspard-Félix Tournachon, also known as Nadar (1820–1910)
 Gavin Bell (born 1971)
 George Bahgoury (born 1932)
 George Bickham the Younger (c. 1706–1771)
 George Cruikshank (1792–1880)
 George Moutard Woodward (c. 1760–1809)
 George Wachsteter (1911–2004)
 Georges Goursat (1863–1934)
 Gerald Scarfe (born 1936)
 Gerhard Haderer (born 1951)
 Glen Hanson
 Glynis Sweeny (born 1962)
 György Rózsahegyi (1940–2010)
 Henri de Toulouse-Lautrec (1864–1901)
 Henry Bateman (1887–1970)
 Henry Bunbury (1750–1811)
 Henry Wigstead (died 1800)
 Hermann Mejia (born 1973)
 Honoré Daumier (1808–1879)
 Isa Macnie (1869–1958)
 Isaac Cruikshank (1786–1856)
 Jack Davis (1924–2016)
 Jacques Callot (1592–1635)
 James Gillray (1756–1815)
 James Sayers (1748–1825)
 Jaume Capdevila, "Kap" (born 1974)
 Javad Alizadeh (born 1953)
 J.J. Grandville (1803–1847)
 Jean-Pierre Dantan (1800–1869)
 Jeff Hook (1928–2018)
 Jim McDermott (born 1960)
 Joe Grant (1908–2005)
 John Doyle (1797–1868)
 John Kay (1742–1826)
 John Leech (1817–1864)
 John Tenniel (1820–1914)
 Jovan Prokopljević (born 1940)
 Karl Meersman (born 1961)
 Kate Carew (1869–1961)
 Ken Fallin (born 1948)
 Kenny Meadows (1790–1874)
 Kerry G. Johnson (born 1966)
 Kerry Waghorn (born 1947)
 Louis Hirshman (1905–1986)
 Luigi Borgomainerio (1836–1876)
 Malky McCormick (1943–2019)
 Marc Sleen (1922–2016)
 Marjorie Organ (1886–1930)
 Massoud Mehrabi (1954–2020)
 Max Beerbohm (1872–1956)
 Melchiorre Delfico (1825–1895)
 Mort Drucker (1929–2020)
 Murray Webb (born 1947)
 Nikolai Stepanov (1807–1877)
 Oğuz Aral (1936–2004)
 Osama Hajjaj (born 1973)
 Oscar Berger (1901–1997)
 Omaya Joha (born 1972)
 Patrick Oliphant (born 1935)
 Paul Gavarni (1804–1866)
 Pedro X. Molina
 Peggy Bacon (1895–1987)
 Philip Burke (born 1956)
 Pier Leone Ghezzi (1674–1755)
 Prakash Shetty (born 1960)
 Predrag Koraksić Corax (born 1933)
 Rafael Bordalo Pinheiro (1846–1905)
 Ralph Steadman (born 1936)
 Ranan Lurie (1932–2022)
 Raoul Hunter (1926–2018)
 Richard  Newton (1777–1798)
 Robert Grossman (1940–2018)
 Robert Risko (born 1956)
 Ronald Searle (1920–2011)
 S. Jithesh (born 1974)
 Sam Berman (1906–1995)
 Sam Norkin (1917–2011)
 Sam Viviano (born 1953)
 Sebastian Krüger (born 1963)
 Seyran Caferli (born 1966)
 Shawn McManus (born 1958)
 Shekhar Gurera, India (born 1965)
 Stephen Rotluanga (born 1952)
 Steve Bell (born 1951)
 Steve Brodner (born 1954)
 Thomas Nast (1840–1902)
 Thomas Rowlandson (1756–1827)
 Tom Bachtell (born 1957)
 Tom Richmond (born 1966)
 Vitaliy Peskov (1944–2002) (Russian: Виталий Песков)
 Vyvyan Donner (1895–1965)
 William Auerbach-Levy (1889–1964)
 William Austin (1721–1820)
  William  Heath (1794–1840)
 William Hogarth (1697–1764)
 Wyncie King (1884–1961)

See also 
List of science fiction visual artists
List of cartoonists
List of graphic designers

References 

Visual arts occupations
Lists of people by occupation